The Posavina Canton (Serbian and) is one of ten cantons of the Federation of Bosnia and Herzegovina in Bosnia and Herzegovina. It is the smallest canton with an area of only . The canton is an exclave of Federation of Bosnia and Herzegovina, being bordered by Republika Srpska and Brčko District to the south and the river Sava and Croatia to the north. Its capital is Orašje and the largest town is Odžak.

History 
The Posavina area was inhabited since prehistoric times, as evidenced by various archaeological finds of coins and other artifacts. After the 1718 Treaty of Passarowitz between the Ottoman Empire and Habsburg monarchy, mostly Catholic families from mountain villages were displaced across the plains, as the Turks themselves settled in the hills and valleys. The Croats from Županja, Babina Greda and Štitar moved to the villages of Kopanice, Vidovice, Tolisa and Domaljevac.

The current municipalities of Derventa and Bosanski Brod were settled by people from Herzegovina between the years 1735 and 1782, and once again in a minor wave in 1820. Since 1697, approximately 20,000 Catholics emigrated from the area. Most of the people emigrated to the municipalities of Modriča, Gradačac, Orašje, Bosanski Šamac and Brčko from Mostar, Posušje, Uskoplje, Bugojno, Livno and Duvno.

Before the Bosnian War, the present-day municipalities of Donji Žabar and Vukosavlje belonged to Odžak and Orašje, while the present-day municipality of Domaljevac-Šamac belonged to Bosanski Šamac. The history of today's canton begins on March 18, 1994, with the signing of the Washington Agreement. Posavina Canton was officially established on June 12, 1996 as one of the ten cantons of the Federation of Bosnia and Herzegovina, one of the 3 Croat-majority cantons.

Politics and Government 
According to the law, Posavina Canton is one of the ten cantons of the Federation of Bosnia and Herzegovina, which is one of the two entities of Bosnia and Herzegovina.

Posavina has its own legislative, executive and judicial powers. Like each of the cantons of FBiH, Canton Posavina has its own constitution, assembly, government, symbols and has a number of exclusive competences (police, education, use of natural resources, spatial and housing policy, culture), while some competences are divided between federal and cantonal authorities (health, social protection, transport). The seat of the executive power, i.e. the capital of the canton, is Orašje (Posavina Cantonal Government), while in Domaljevac is the seat of the legislative power (Posavina Cantonal Assembly) and in Odžak is the seat of the judiciary.

Every four years, the citizens of Canton Posavina vote in general elections for a total of 21 deputies in the Assembly of Canton Posavina. Based on the general elections, the current KP government is formed by a coalition between the Party of Democratic Action (SDA), the coalition of the Croatian Democratic Union of Bosnia and Herzegovina (HDZ BiH) and the Croatian Party of the Rights of Bosnia and Herzegovina. (HSP BiH).

At the local level, the citizens of Posavina Canton vote for the government in three municipalities every four years in free elections.

The cantonal assembly is composed of:
Croatian Democratic Union, HSS BiH, HKDU BiH – 11
Croatian Democratic Union 1990 – 3
Party of Democratic Action – 2
Posavina Party – 2
Social Democratic Party of Bosnia and Herzegovina – 1
Union for a Better Future of BiH – 1
Movement of Democratic Action – 1

Geography
The canton lies near the border with Croatia and near the river Sava which forms a natural border between Bosnia and Herzegovina and Croatia. The canton consist of two unconnected exclaves: the western one consisting of Odžak municipality and the eastern one consisting of Orašje and Domaljevac-Šamac municipalities.

Posavina is a region which includes other parts of Bosnia and Herzegovina and parts of Croatia. Because of that, this canton is sometimes called Bosanska Posavina (Bosnian Posavina) and is the only part of northern Bosnia near the border with Croatia that lies in the Federation. The rest of northern Bosnia near the river Sava and near the border is the Brčko District and the Republika Srpska. The Brčko district divides Republika Srpska into 2 parts.

The Posavina canton's position near the Sava river makes it a good place for agriculture because it is a flat lowland and there are no mountains in the area. It is like this in the entire northern border with Croatia, with a great deal of farming and agriculture. The river Sava is a river that flows through Slovenia, Croatia, Bosnia and Herzegovina and Serbia. In Bosnia and Herzegovina it flows through the northern border and makes a natural border between Bosnia and Herzegovina and Croatia.

Posavina means literally along Sava in the Bosnian language. The river Sava is the largest navigable river in Bosnia and Herzegovina. Much of the food in both Bosnia and Herzegovina and Croatia comes from this region, not only Bosnian Posavina but the rest of the fertile fields along the river Sava.

Municipalities
The canton consists of the municipalities of Domaljevac-Šamac, Odžak, and Orašje.

Demographics

2013 Census

1991 Census

Economy 
In the pre-war period, especially in the last ten years, the canton was one of the richest areas in Bosnia and Herzegovina. It is important in agriculture (Posavina is the largest granary in Bosnia and Herzegovina), economically (oil refinery in Bosanski Brod and Modriča, furniture, textiles, shoe factories, metal industry, chemical industry, etc.), river resources natural, forests, and the region is also known for the fact that many people did temporary jobs abroad. The area is oriented towards the West with convincing indicators of a very rapid integration into European cultural, economic and civilizational trends.

Culture

Sport

HNK Orašje, the local football club from Orašje that won the Bosnia and Herzegovina Football Cup in the 2005–06 season.

Religion 
The majority of its population professes Christianity, with the Catholic Church being the most important denomination within the population with 33,191 inhabitants in the Canton of Posavina (representing more than 77 percent of the population). The most significant non-Christian minority is made up of Muslims (8,341 inhabitants) and there are also other Christians such as members of the Serbian Orthodox Church (841 inhabitants).

See also
 Political divisions of Bosnia and Herzegovina
 List of heads of the Posavina Canton

References

 
Cantons of the Federation of Bosnia and Herzegovina